Arum × sooi is an hybrid plant in the family Araceae, resulting from hybridisation between the diploid Arum cylindraceum and the tetraploid Arum maculatum .

References

sooi
Plant nothospecies